Shane Lewis (18 March 1973 – 21 February 2021) was an Australian swimmer. He competed in the men's 100 metre breaststroke event at the 1992 Summer Olympics.

References

External links
 

1973 births
2021 suicides
Australian male breaststroke swimmers
Olympic swimmers of Australia
Swimmers at the 1992 Summer Olympics
Place of birth missing
Place of death missing
Suicides in Australia